Choi Jae-Soo (born 2 May 1983) is a South Korean footballer who plays as full back for Gyeongnam FC.

On 22 October 2009, he was discharged from the army and returned to FC Seoul. Choi officially signed a two-year contract with Ulsan Hyundai for an undisclosed fee on 26 January 2010.

Career statistics

References

External links 

1983 births
Living people
Association football defenders
South Korean footballers
FC Seoul players
Gimcheon Sangmu FC players
Ulsan Hyundai FC players
Suwon Samsung Bluewings players
Pohang Steelers players
Jeonbuk Hyundai Motors players
Gyeongnam FC players
K League 1 players
Yonsei University alumni